General Burns may refer to:

E. L. M. Burns (1897–1985), Canadian Army lieutenant general
George Burns (British Army officer) (1911–1997), British Army major general
Joseph Burns (U.S. politician) (1800–1875), Ohio Militia major general
Robert Whitney Burns (1908–1964), U.S. Air Force lieutenant general
William F. Burns (1932–2021), U.S. Army major general
William Wallace Burns (1825–1892), Union Army brigadier general

See also
Attorney General Burns (disambiguation)